Trunk Highway 310 (MN 310) is a highway in northwest Minnesota, which runs from its intersection with MN 11 and MN 89 in Roseau and continues north to its northern terminus at the Canadian border; where the route becomes Manitoba Provincial Road 310 (PR 310) upon crossing the border, near the community of South Junction, Manitoba.

Route description
MN 310 begins at a four-way intersection in Roseau with MN 11 to the east and west, and MN 89 to the south and west. MN 310 travels north through the city as 5th Avenue NW. It passes just west of the Roseau County Fairgrounds before leaving the city and continuing north through rural northern Minnesota. A few miles north of Roseau, the route crosses the Roseau River, then bends slightly to the east to avoid crossing it twice. North of the Roseau River, the highway crosses the Sprague Creek before entering the Lost River State Forest. MN 310 treks through the forest for a few miles, then curves to the northeast just south of the Canadian border. The route then reaches the border and continues into Manitoba as PR 310.

History
MN 310 was authorized on April 24, 1959. At this time, the route was unpaved. The portion between the Canadian border and Sprague Creek was paved in 1962, and the remainder was paved in 1965.

Major intersections

References

External links

Highway 310 at the Unofficial Minnesota Highways Page

310
Transportation in Roseau County, Minnesota